Balsam pear may refer to:
Momordica balsamina, a vine native to Africa
Bitter melon (Momordica charantia), a vine grown for its bitter and edible fruit